Salisbury was a local government district in Wiltshire, England from 1974 to 2009. Its main urban area was the city of Salisbury.

The district was formed on 1 April 1974, under the Local Government Act 1972 and the pursuant The English Non-metropolitan Districts (Definition) Order 1972 as a merger of the previous municipal boroughs of Salisbury and Wilton, along with Amesbury Rural District, Mere and Tisbury Rural District and Salisbury and Wilton Rural District.

On 1 April 2009, the district was abolished as part of the 2009 structural changes to local government in England, when its functions were taken over by the new Wiltshire Council unitary authority. At the same time, a parish council serving only Salisbury and its suburbs was formed, called Salisbury City Council.

Political control 

The political control of the council was as follows:

1976–1979 NOC (No Overall Control)
1979–1983 NOC
1983–1987 NOC
1987–1991 Conservative
1991–1995 Conservative
1995–1999 Liberal Democrat
1999–2003 NOC
2003–2007 Conservative
2007–2009 NOC (administration by coalition of Liberal Democrat and Labour)

The political composition of the authority when it came to an end on 1 April 2009 was 22 Conservatives, 19 Liberal Democrats, ten Labour members, and four Independents.

Composition 

All members of the council were elected at an "all out" election held once every four years, on the first Thursday in May.  

Notes
LD is used to refer to predecessor parties, the Liberal Party and SDP–Liberal Alliance.
OTH includes small groups such as Residents' association and Independents.
Control is the party which had absolute numerical majority, rather than the party or parties that formed a coalition administration.

Wards 

In 1975 a statutory instrument established the wards to be used by Salisbury District Council. These boundaries would be in use from the 1976 council elections (with some minor alternations) until 2003, when new ward boundaries came into effect.

In 1998, the Local Government Commission for England began a review of ward boundaries in Salisbury district. After an initial draft proposal and a period of consultation it recommended a reduction in councillors from 58 to 55, and a redrawing of ward boundaries reducing the number to 28. Final recommendations for Salisbury were made in 1999, and were implemented under the District of Salisbury (Electoral Changes) Order 1999. The new boundaries were first used in the 2003 local elections and remained in use until 2009, when the council was dissolved.

Places

Citations 

Politics of Salisbury
English districts abolished in 2009
Former non-metropolitan districts of Wiltshire